FC Zooveti Tbilisi   is a Georgian football club that is based in Tbilisi. In 2010–11 the club became champions of the Georgian Meore Liga and were automatically promoted to the Georgian Pirveli Liga championship, where they are currently playing.

Achievements
 Meore Liga : 2010–2011

Current squad

External links
 Official website
 Our Partner 
 Soccerway Statistics

Zooveti Tbilisi
Zooveti Tbilisi, FC
Association football clubs established in 1975
1975 establishments in Georgia (country)